Shwenankyawshin Narapati (22 September 1476 – 14 March 1527) was king of Ava from 1501 to 1527. His reign saw the disintegration of the Ava Kingdom. He spent much of his reign fighting back the attacks from the Confederation of Shan States. But his efforts ultimately proved unsuccessful. The king died fighting while defending his capital from Confederation attacks, after which Ava Kingdom was taken over by the Confederation.

Early life and accession
Shwenankyawshin was born Min Swe to King Minkhaung II and Chief Queen Atula Thiri Dhamma Dewi on 22 September 1476. He was the second of four children of the couple. He had an elder brother Thihatura II and two younger sisters Soe Min and Min Pwa Saw. As the second eldest son of the chief queen, Min Swe was a senior prince but was not the heir apparent. Minkhaung II upon his accession anointed his eldest son Thihathura II heir apparent, and him the joint-king in 1485. The arrangement stayed until March 1501 when Thihathura II suddenly died, and Shwenankyawshin was made the heir-apparent. But when Minkhaung II also died a month later on 7 April 1501 (5th waning of Late Tagu 862 ME), Shwenankyawshin found himself king. His coronation took place on either 18 April 1501 (1st waxing of Kason 863 ME) or 10 May 1501 (9th waning of Kason 863). In the Burmese royal tradition, he took the chief queen of Thihathura as his chief queen.

Reign

Start of rebellions

Like his predecessors before him, the new king at Ava had to reestablish his authority over the vassal states. At first, the long-term rebellion by his uncle Minye Kyawswa of Yamethin ended with the latter's death in June/July 1501 (Waso 863 ME, 16 June to 15 July 1501). But rebellions resumed almost immediately. In November/December 1501 (Natdaw 863 ME, 11 November to 9 December 1501), Nawrahta of Yamethin, the eldest son of Thihathura II, sent an assassin to kill Shwenankyawshin, which nearly succeeded. Both the assassin and Nawrahta were caught. Nawrahta, of being royal blood, was drowned.

War with the Confederation of Shan states
However, anti-Ava forces had increasingly become more pronounced in his reign. Throughout his reign, the Confederation of Shan States, made up of former Ava vassal states, launched their relentless attacks, and gradually absorbed Avan territory from the north, while their ally Prome (Pyay) took Avan territory in the south. In 1505–1506, the Confederation forces led by Sawlon, the saopha of Mohnyin, raided Avan territory all the way down to Dabayin while Prome raided up to Magwe in 1508–1509. A desperate Narapati tried to keep Toungoo (Taungoo) as an ally by giving the all important Kyaukse granary to the nominally vassal kingdom but Mingyi Nyo of Toungoo declared independence in October 1510, and gave no help. Ava's only steadfast ally was Hsipaw (Thibaw) led by its saopha Hkonmaing.

Troubles continued. Sawlon seized Bhamo, Hsipaw's vassal in 1511, and raided deep into Upper Burma in 1517–1518. In 1519, the Shan state of Kale also revolted, and Ava had to reclaim it. By the early 1520s, Avan territory had shrunk so much that it was not much bigger than its former vassal states. In late 1523, the Confederation and Prome jointly attacked Ava's territories from the north and the south. Ava with Hsipaw fought back but gradually got squeezed in. A year and half later, on 22 March 1525, the combined armies sacked Ava, forcing Narapati and Hkonmaing to flee the city. In 1527, the Confederation forces again came back and laid siege to Ava. On 14 March 1527, the king died from a gunshot wound while fighting in the battle. The Confederation took Ava, and their leader Sawlon made his son Thohanbwa king of Ava, making it just another Shan state. The conquest ended Ava's 163-year (1364–1527) role as the dominant power in Upper Burma (Myanmar). Many people from Ava fled to Toungoo, the only remaining safe haven.

Namesake
The king is posthumously remembered as Shwenankyawshin (lit. "Lord of Exquisite Golden Palace) because he built a new "exquisite golden palace" at Ava on 22 February 1511 (Saturday, 9th waning of Tabaung 872 ME).

References

Bibliography
 
 
 
 
 
 
 

Ava dynasty
1476 births
1527 deaths
16th-century Burmese monarchs